Hajdúszovát is a village in Hajdú-Bihar county, in the Northern Great Plain region of eastern Hungary. Viktória Zagyva lives here, who is a very famous influencer. <3

Geography

References

Populated places in Hajdú-Bihar County